Andreas Seeger is a mathematician who works in the field of harmonic analysis. He is a professor of mathematics at the University of Wisconsin–Madison. He received his PhD from Technische Universität Darmstadt in 1985 under the supervision of Walter Trebels.

He was elected a fellow of the American Mathematical Society in 2014 for his contributions to Fourier integral operators, local smoothing,
oscillatory integrals, and Fourier multipliers. In 2017, he was awarded the Humboldt Prize.
He was awarded a Simons Fellowship in 2019.

References

External links 
 

Living people
Year of birth missing (living people)
Place of birth missing (living people)
Nationality missing
20th-century German mathematicians
21st-century German mathematicians
University of Wisconsin–Madison faculty
Technische Universität Darmstadt alumni
Fellows of the American Mathematical Society
Mathematical analysts